XHFN-FM 91.1/XEFN-AM 1130 is a combo radio station in Uruapan, Michoacán. It is known as Candela with a grupera format.

History
XEFN received its first concession on April 25, 1953, owned by Guillermo Navarro Quiroz. After Guillermo's death, ownership passed to Esperanza Murguia Vda. de Quiroz, his widow.

In 1994, XEFN became an AM-FM combo.

References

Spanish-language radio stations
Radio stations in Michoacán
Radio stations established in 1953